The Haunted Mouse is a 1941 Warner Bros. Looney Tunes cartoon directed by Tex Avery.  This film was the first cartoon written by Michael Maltese. The short was released on February 15, 1941.

Plot

A starving cat sees a sign that says "Ma's Place/Home Cooking/3 Miles." He rushes into town at once, but neglects to read the part that says that the town is full of 100 ghosts.  One of the ghosts happens to be a mouse, who wants revenge on cats for tormenting him all his life. The mouse decides that the cat would make a perfect target for torment, and sets out to ruin his life. However, the cat is killed, turning him into a ghost, and the mouse flees the town.

References

External links

1941 animated films
1941 films
1940s ghost films
Animated films about cats
Animated films about mice
Looney Tunes shorts
Films directed by Tex Avery
1940s American animated films
Films scored by Carl Stalling
American black-and-white films
Films with screenplays by Michael Maltese
1940s English-language films